San Juan earthquake may refer to different earthquakes to affect San Juan, Argentina or the San Juan Province, Argentina:

 1894 San Juan earthquake, a  magnitude earthquake affecting La Rioja and San Juan
 1944 San Juan earthquake, a  magnitude earthquake, which led to 10,000 deaths
 1952 San Juan earthquake, a  magnitude earthquake 
 1977 San Juan earthquake, a  magnitude earthquake affecting the city of Caucete